Children of the Corn is the fourth EP from Sopor Æternus & the Ensemble of Shadows and the third and final part of the trilogy A Triptychon of GHOSTS (or: El Sexorcismo de Anna-Varney Cantodea), following EP A Strange Thing to Say and album Have You Seen This Ghost?.

The album was released in November 2011 in two different formats: in compact disc format with a hardcover photo book, coin an exclusive T-shirt (limited to 1999 copies); and on 12-inch vinyl with two posters and a different, exclusive T-shirt (limited to 693 copies.) Both editions are signed and numbered by Anna-Varney Cantodea herself.

Track listing

Personnel 
Thomas Haug: Violin (1-3)
Nikos Mavridis: Violin (4-7)
Tim Ströble: Cello
Uta Ferson: Clarinet
Eric Cheg: Bassoon
Olegg Mancovicz: Oud
Eugene de la Fountaine: Tuba
Burt Eerie: Drums
Terrence Bat: Drums
Patrick Damiani: Recording, Mixing, Engineering
Robin Schmidt: Mastering
Anna-Varney Cantodea: Vocals, All other instruments, Programming, Mixing

References 

2011 albums
Sopor Aeternus and The Ensemble of Shadows albums